Get Out While You Can is the second studio album by Australian musician Dan Sultan, released in November 2009.

At the ARIA Music Awards of 2010, Sultan won two awards; ARIA Award for Best Male Artist and Best Blues and Roots Album.

Track listing

Charts

Release history

References

2009 albums
Self-released albums
Dan Sultan albums
ARIA Award-winning albums